11/8 may refer to:
A time signature e.g.: "The Eleven" by the Grateful Dead
November 8 (month-day date notation)
August 11 (day-month date notation)
11 shillings and 8 pence in UK predecimal currency

See also
118 (disambiguation)
8/11 (disambiguation)